The 2015 NASCAR Whelen Modified Tour was the thirty-first season of the Whelen Modified Tour (WMT). It began with the Icebreaker 150 at Thompson Speedway Motorsports Park on April 12 and concluded at the same venue with the Sunoco World Series 150 on October 18.

Defending champion Doug Coby won his third series title, and as a result, became the first driver since Tony Hirschman Jr. to win successive Whelen Modified Tour championships. Coby was the season's most prolific winner – with seven victories – including the final three races which allowed him to overhaul Ryan Preece in the standings, with Coby ultimately prevailing by eleven points after entering the final race tied on points with Preece. Preece was a four-time race winner, and finished all but one race inside the top-ten placings. Just like Preece, Woody Pitkat recorded fourteen top-ten finishes out of fifteen starts – winning at Stafford along with the non-championship Shootout at New Hampshire – as he finished third in points, two down on Preece and thirteen behind Coby. The only other drivers to win races during the season were Todd Szegedy at New Hampshire and Justin Bonsignore, who swept both races at his local track, Riverhead Raceway.

Drivers

Notes

Schedule

The Whelen All-Star Shootout did not count towards the championship. 10 races from the 2015 season were televised on NBCSN, on a tape-delay basis.

Notes

Results and standings

Races

Notes
1 – There was no qualifying session for the Whelen All-Star Shootout. The starting grid was decided with a random draw.

Drivers' championship

(key) Bold - Pole position awarded by time. Italics - Pole position set by final practice results or rainout. * – Most laps led.

Notes
‡ – Non-championship round.
1 – Wade Cole, Melissa Fifield, Jeff Goodale, Paul Hartwig Jr., Gary McDonald, Anthony Nocella, George Perreault, Dave Sapienza, and Danny Watts Jr. received championship points, despite the fact that they did not qualify for the race.
2 – Cole Powell received championship points, despite the fact that he did not start the race.
3 – Scored points towards the Whelen Southern Modified Tour.
4 – Chuck Steuer, Frank Vigliarolo Jr. and Danny Watts Jr. received championship points, despite the fact that they did not qualify for the race.

See also

2015 NASCAR Sprint Cup Series
2015 NASCAR Xfinity Series
2015 NASCAR Camping World Truck Series
2015 NASCAR K&N Pro Series East
2015 NASCAR K&N Pro Series West
2015 NASCAR Whelen Southern Modified Tour
2015 NASCAR Canadian Tire Series
2015 NASCAR Mexico Series
2015 NASCAR Whelen Euro Series

References